Oreste Benzi (7 September 1925 - 2 November 2007) was an Italian Catholic priest and the founder of the "Associazione Comunità Papa Giovanni XXIII". Benzi championed the rights of the individual and founded his association to aid teenagers in their lives and their path to Jesus Christ while also striving to evangelize to those including the destitute.

The cause for sainthood commenced in 2014 under Pope Francis and he is titled as a Servant of God.

Life
Oreste Benzi was born in San Clemente on 7 September 1925 as the seventh of nine children to the poor Achille Benzi and Rosa Silvagni - it was she who instilled a sense of great piousness in her children.

Benzi had to repeat his first grade at school due to contracting the measles and being ill all winter which prevented him from attending school. His second grade teacher Olga Baldani spoke of a priest and of a scientist and explorer in a tale meant to challenge the students as to what would seem the better profession. This had a profound impact on Benzi who returned home and told his mother that he wanted to become a priest.

He commenced his studies for the priesthood in 1937 first at Urbino for a brief period of time and then at Rimini. He transferred his studies to Bologna due to Allied bombings during World War II around Rimini. Benzi received his ordination to the priesthood on 29 June 1949 from the Bishop of Rimini Luigi Santa. He was appointed as the chaplain for the parish of San Nicolò in Rimini on 5 July 1949 and in October 1950 was made a teacher of seminarians and later the vice-assistant for Catholic Youth; he became the assistant in 1952. Benzi was later made - in 1953 - the spiritual director of students in Rimini and he later oversaw the establishment of an Alpine vacation home for teenagers in Alba di Canazei (built between 1958 and 1961) that saw him make several visits to the United States of America in order to raise funds.

In 1968 he founded the Associazione Comunità Papa Giovanni XXIII - in honor of Pope John XXIII - though formal establishment as an "association" was not until 1971. The priest opened the first home for families at Coriano on 3 July 1973 and he officiated at its official opening. The Italian government recognized the movement - for legal reasons - on 5 July 1972 while it received diocesan recognition on 25 May 1983 as an "ecclesial gathering". The Pontifical Council for the Laity recognized Benzi's movement as an "association of the faithful" on 7 October 1998.

Benzi was known for his action in defense of those who were marginalised and his battle against prostitution and homosexual unions. His work bought him into contact several times with Pope John Paul II. From 1969 until 2000 he served as a parish priest at the Resurrection parish in the Grotta Rossa neighbourhood of Rimini. The likes of Mother Teresa and Maximilian Kolbe inspired him and spiritual writers such as Cardinal Henri de Lubac and Antoine Chevrier also inspired him.

Benzi died in the first hours of the morning on 2 November 2007 at 2:22 a.m. after suffering a heart attack. More than 10 000 mourners attended his funeral and it included several of the prostitutes that he had rescued; the Bishop of Rimini Francesco Lambiasi officiated the funeral. His movement is now present in a total of 27 European countries as well as being present in Asia and Africa as well as Latin America; amongst the nations it operates in are the United Kingdom and Australia.

Beatification process
The beatification process commenced under Pope Francis on 3 January 2014 after the Congregation for the Causes of Saints issued the official "nihil obstat" and named him as a Servant of God; the Bishop of Rimini Francesco Lambiasi inaugurated the diocesan process on 27 September 2014 and it is still ongoing.

The postulator for this cause - since its beginning - is Elisabetta Casadei.

Selected writings 
Benzi wrote more than sixty books during his life, many of which are untranslated into English at 2019. Along with his activity of missionary and educator among the young children, he was devoted to the prayer in honour of the Blessed Virgin Mary and the Saints. He is the author of some unusual spiritual writings on the Real Presence the Triune of God into the human heart, ls called as Mistical Union of Christ. In such a way, he shared a spiritual life like the one testified by Itala Mela and Chiara Lubich.

See also
 Streetwise priest

References

External links

 Hagiography Circle
 Community of Pope John XXIII
 Obituary in The Times (10 November 2007)

1925 births
2007 deaths
20th-century venerated Christians
20th-century Italian Roman Catholic priests
21st-century venerated Christians
21st-century Italian Roman Catholic priests
Italian Servants of God
People from Rimini